John Alec Kimbrough (June 14, 1918 – May 8, 2006) was a college athlete, a member of the Texas Legislature, the star of two western movies and a rancher. His older brother Frank Kimbrough served as head football coach at Baylor and West Texas A&M.

Football
Kimbrough, an alumnus of Texas A&M University, was known as the "Haskell Hurricane" when he played Texas A&M Aggies football team. He played fullback on the Aggie's undefeated 1939 national championship team. In 1940 he finished second to the University of Michigan's Tom Harmon in Heisman Trophy balloting. According to his College Football Hall of Fame biography, Jarrin' John was a punishing 6 ft 2 in tall 210 lb running back known for breaking tackles with his high knee action who was honored with induction into that organization in 1954.

In 1941, he started along Tom Harmon in the New York Americans backfield in the third American Football League and became the team's primary running threat after Harmon left the team for military service.

Acting
After the AFL folded in response to the Japanese attack on Pearl Harbor, Kimbrough parlayed his gridiron fame and athletic good looks into a Hollywood contract, though he only appeared in two western motion pictures, Sundown Jim and The Lone Star Ranger, both released in 1942.

Military
He later served as an Army pilot in the Pacific Theater of Operations during World War II.

Return to football
Returning from military service, Kimbrough played for the Los Angeles Dons of the All-America Football Conference; unfortunately, his second run at a professional football career was cut short by a series of heart attacks that started when he was only 30 years old. He was forced to leave the game in 1948 after three seasons with the Dons.

Politics
Kimbrough was elected to the Texas House of Representatives in 1953 as a Democrat.

Death
Kimbrough died May 8, 2006, in Haskell, Texas. The cause of death was pneumonia.

References

 Staff and Wire Report. (13 May 2006). John Kimbrough, 87; Football Star, B-Movie Actor, Texas Legislator. Los Angeles Times

External links
 
 
 

1918 births
2006 deaths
American football fullbacks
Los Angeles Dons players
New York Americans (1940 AFL) players
Texas A&M Aggies football players
All-American college football players
College Football Hall of Fame inductees
American male actors
United States Army Air Forces pilots of World War II
United States Army Air Forces officers
Democratic Party members of the Texas House of Representatives
People from Haskell, Texas
Players of American football from Texas
20th-century American politicians
Deaths from pneumonia in Texas
Military personnel from Texas